The September 1590 papal conclave elected Cardinal Giovanni Battista Castagna as Pope Urban VII.

There were sixty-seven cardinals attending: seven were French, three Spanish, two Germans, two Poles, and the rest Italian.

Cardinals attending:

Giovanni Antonio Serbelloni,  (aged 71), Suburbicarian Bishop of Ostia and Velletri, Dean of the Sacred College
Alfonso Gesualdo (aged 50), Suburbicarian Bishop of Porto and Santa Rufina
Innico d'Avalos d'Aragona (aged 55 or 56), Suburbicarian Bishop of Frascati
Marco Antonio Colonna, Suburbicarian Bishop of Palestrina
Tolomeo Gallio (aged 63), Suburbicarian Bishop of Sabina
Gabriele Paleotti (aged 68), Suburbicarian Bishop of Albano
Girolamo Simoncelli (aged 68), Cardinal Priest of Santa Prisca; Administrator of Orvieto.
Markus Sitticus von Hohenems Altemps (aged 57), nephew of Pius IV, Cardinal Priest of S. Giorgio in Velabro
Nicolas de Pellevé (aged 75), Cardinal Priest of S. Prassede (died 1594) Archbishop of Sens.
Ludovico Madruzzo (aged 58), nephew of Cardinal Cristoforo Madruzzi, Cardinal Priest of S. Onofrio (d. 1600) Bishop of Trent.
Michele Bonelli, OP (aged 49), Cardinal Priest of S. Lorenzo in Lucina, Cardinal Vicar of Rome, grand nephew of Pius V,
Antonio Carafa (aged 52), Cardinal Priest of S. Giovanni e Paolo
Giulio Antonio Santorio (aged 57), Cardinal Priest of S. Bartolommeo all' Isola
Girolamo Rusticucci (aged 53), Cardinal Priest of S. Susanna, former Bishop of SinigagliaVicar General of Rome
Gian Girolamo Albani (aged 86), Cardinal Priest of San Giovanni a Porta Latina
Pedro de Deza (aged 70), Cardinal Priest of San Girolamo dei Croati; professor of law at Salamanca. Grand Inquisitor
Giovanni Vincenzo Gonzaga (aged 49), Cardinal Priest of S. Alessio. Knight of St. John of Jerusalem
Giovanni Antonio Facchinetti (aged 71), Cardinal Priest of Santi Quattro Coronati
Giovanni Battista Castagna (aged 68), Cardinal Priest of S. Marcello. Doctor in utroque iure, Bologna elected as Pope Urban VII
Alessandro de' Medici (aged 55), Cardinal Priest of S. Giovanni e Paolo
Niccolò Sfondrati (aged 55), Cardinal Priest of S. Cecilia Bishop of Cremona
Giulio Canani (aged 66), Cardinal Priest of S. Anastasia Bishop of Modena
Agostino Valier (aged 59), Cardinal Priest of S. Marco; Bishop of Verona
Antonmaria Salviati (aged 53), Cardinal Priest of S. Maria della Pace
Vincenzo Lauro (aged 67) Cardinal Priest of S. Clemente, Bishop of Mondovi
Simeone Tagliavia d'Aragonia(aged 40), Cardinal Priest of S. Maria degli Angeli
Filippo Spinola (aged 55), Cardinal Priest of S. Sabina
Scipione Lancelotti (aged 63), Cardinal Priest of S. Salvatore in Lauro
Giovanni Battista Castrucci (aged 49), Cardinal Priest of S. Maria in Aracoeli, Archbishop of Chieti
Federico Cornaro (aged 59), Cardinal Priest of S. Stefano Rotondo, Bishop of Padua
Domenico Pinello (aged 49), Cardinal Priest of S. Crisogono, professor of law at Padua; Archpriest of S. Maria Maggiore
Ippolito Aldobrandini (aged 54), Cardinal Priest of S. Pancrazio; Major Penitentiary
Girolamo della Rovere (aged 62), Cardinal Priest of S. Pietro in vincoli, Archbishop of Turin
Girolamo Bernerio, OP (aged 50), Cardinal Priest of S. Maria sopra Minerva, Bishop of Ascoli Piceno
Antonio Maria Galli (37), Cardinal Priest of S. Agnese in Agone, Bishop of Perugia
Costanzo da Sarnano, OFM Conv. (aged 59), Cardinal Priest of S. Pietro in Montorio
Benedetto Giustiniani (aged 36), Cardinal Priest of S. Marcello
William Allen (aged 58), Cardinal Priest of SS. Silvestro e Martino
Scipione Gonzaga (aged 47), Cardinal Priest of S. Maria del Popolo, Latin Patriarch of Jerusalem
Antonmaria Sauli (aged 49), Cardinal Priest of S. Stefano al Monte Celio, former Bishop of Genoa
Giovanni Palotta (aged 42), Cardinal Priest of S. Matteo in Merulana, former archbishop of Cosenza, Archpriest of the Vatican Basilica Papal Datary
Juan Hurtado de Mendoza (aged 42), Cardinal Priest of S. Maria in Trastevere
Giovan Francesco Morosini (aged 53), Cardinal Priest of S. Maria in Via, Bishop of Brescia
Mariano Pierbenedetti (aged 52) Cardinal Priest of SS. Marcellino e Pietro
Gregorio Petrocchini (aged 55), Cardinal Priest of S. Agostino
Francesco Sforza di Santa Fiora (aged 28), Cardinal Deacon of S. Maria in Via Lata, Grand-nephew of Pope Paul III.
Alessandro Damasceni Peretti (aged 19), Cardinal Deacon of S. Lorenzo in Damaso, Vice-Chancellor of the Holy Roman Church, grand-nephew of Sixtus V
Girolamo Mattei (aged 43), Cardinal Deacon of S. Eustachio
Ascanio Colonna (aged 30), Cardinal Deacon of S. Maria in Cosmedin. Knight of Malta
Federico Borromeo (aged 26), Cardinal Deacon of S. Nicola in Carcere Tulliano
Agostino Cusani (aged 48), Cardinal Priest of S. Lorenzo in Panisperna
Francesco Maria Del Monte (aged 41), Cardinal Deacon of S. Maria in Domnica
Guido Pepoli (aged 30), Cardinal Deacon of San Cosma e Damiano

Cardinals that did not attend
Andreas von Austria (aged 31), Cardinal Deacon of Santa Maria Novae
Albrecht von Austria (aged 29), Cardinal Deacon of Santa Croce in Gerusalemme
Gaspar de Quiroga y Vila (aged 78), Cardinal Priest of Santa Balbina, Archbishop of Toledo
Hugues Loubenx de Verdalle (aged 59), Cardinal Deacon of Santa Maria in Portico, Grand Master of the Sovereign order of the Knights of Saint John of Jerusalem
François de Joyeuse (aged 28), Cardinal Priest of Santissima Trinità dei Monti, Archbishop of Toulouse, Protector of France
Jerzy Radzvil (Radziwill) (aged 34), Cardinal Priest of San Sisto Vecchio, Bishop of Krakow
Andrew Báthory (aged 24), Cardinal Deacon of S. Adriano
Rodrigo de Castro Osorio (aged 67), Cardinal Priest of SS. XII Apostoli, Archbishop of Seville
Charles II de Bourbon-Vendôme (aged 28), Cardinal Deacon without a deaconry, Archbishop-elect of Rouen
Enrico Caetani  (aged 40), Cardinal Priest of Santa Pudenziana, Latin Patriarch of Alexandria, Cardinal Camerlengo Legate in France
Charles de Lorraine-Vaudemont (aged 23), Cardinal Deacon of S. Agata in Suburra
Philippe de Lenoncourt (aged 63), Cardinal Priest of San Onofrio
Pierre de Gondi (aged 58), Cardinal Priest of San Silvestro in Capite, Bishop of Paris

References

1590 in the Papal States
1590 in Europe
16th-century elections
1590 in politics
16th-century Catholicism
Papal conclaves